St. Paraskevi's Church is a small 13th-century church in Hoxharë, Fier County, Albania. It became a Cultural Monument of Albania in 1979.

References

Cultural Monuments of Albania
Buildings and structures in Fier